Tom Hanlon (born 20 May 1967) is a Scottish former athlete who competed mainly in the 3000 metres steeplechase. He represented Great Britain at the 1992 Barcelona Olympics. He also represented Great Britain at two World Championships, and Scotland at two Commonwealth Games. His best time for the 3000m steeplechase of 8:12.58 on 3 August 1991 in Monaco, is the Scottish record (as of 2016) and ranks him third on the British all-time list behind Mark Rowland and Colin Reitz.

Hanlon was born in West Germany. His father was a royal signals warrant officer. He finished fourth in the 2000m steeplechase at both the 1985 European Junior Championships, and the 1986 World Junior Championships. After finishing a disappointing 12th at the 1990 Commonwealth Games in January, he went on to finish sixth at the 1990 European Championships in August. He ran 8:18.14 to finish sixth in the 3000m steeplechase final at the 1992 Barcelona Olympics. He also reached the World Championship finals in 1991 and 1993.

Hanlon, who also worked in advertising and sports magazines in the 1980s, is a four-time Scottish champion at 1500m (1987–90). He also finished second at the AAA Championships in the 3000 m steeplechase (1990) and the 1500m (1992).

International competitions

References 

1967 births
Living people
Scottish male steeplechase runners
British male steeplechase runners
Scottish male cross country runners
British male cross country runners
Scottish male long-distance runners
Olympic athletes of Great Britain
Athletes (track and field) at the 1992 Summer Olympics
Commonwealth Games competitors for England
Athletes (track and field) at the 1986 Commonwealth Games
Athletes (track and field) at the 1990 Commonwealth Games